A royal consort is the spouse of a reigning king or queen. Consorts of monarchs of the United Kingdom and its predecessors have no constitutional status or power but many have had significant influence.  There have been 11 royal consorts since Britain's union of the crowns in 1707, eight women, and three men.

Prince Philip, the longest-served and oldest-ever consort, died aged 99 after having served for nearly 70 years. His mother-in-law, Queen Elizabeth The Queen Mother, who died aged 101, lived longer than any other royal consort, but at the time of her death she did not hold the position of consort, as her husband King George VI had died 50 years before her.

After the death of Prince Philip, the position of royal consort was vacant until the death of Elizabeth II on 8 September 2022. Camilla became the queen consort upon the accession of Elizabeth II's eldest son, Charles III, as King.

History
Since the union of England and Scotland in 1707, there have been eleven consorts of the British monarch. Queens between 1727 and 1814 were also Electress of Hanover, as their husbands all held the title of Elector of Hanover. Between 1814 and 1837, queens held the title as Queen of Hanover, as their husbands were Kings of Hanover. The personal union with the United Kingdom ended in 1837 on the accession of Queen Victoria because the succession laws (Salic Law) in Hanover prevented a female inheriting the title if there was any surviving male heir (in the United Kingdom, a male took precedence over only his own sisters, until the Succession to the Crown Act 2013 which removed male primogeniture). In the Austro-Prussian War of 1866, Hanover was annexed by Prussia and became the Province of Hanover.

Style
The wife of the reigning King has typically been styled as "Her Majesty The Queen" and is addressed as "Her Majesty" or "Your Majesty" (When addressing directly). While upon Charles III's accession to the throne Camilla became "The Queen", she has been styled "The Queen Consort". Buckingham Palace has stated that whether Camilla will eventually be known as "The Queen", as queen consorts traditionally are, is "a question for the future".

The husband of a reigning Queen is addressed according to the style he has either been given upon marriage, or prior to marriage - he does not automatically share the same titles, style and honour of his wife.

Exceptions
Not all wives of monarchs have become consorts, as they may have died, been divorced prior to their husbands' ascending the throne, or married after abdication. Such cases include:

Divorced before spouse became monarch
1. Princess Sophia Dorothea of Celle, wife of George, Hereditary Prince of Brunswick-Lüneburg (the future King George I), married 22 November 1682, divorced 28 December 1694, died 13 November 1726.

2. Lady Diana Spencer, wife of Charles, Prince of Wales (the future King Charles III), married 29 July 1981, divorced 28 August 1996, died 31 August 1997.

Married after spouse abdicated
Wallis Warfield, wife of Edward, Duke of Windsor (the former King Edward VIII), married 3 June 1937, widowed 28 May 1972, died 24 April 1986.

Other cases
An unusual case was Princess Caroline of Brunswick-Wolfenbüttel, who had separated from her husband George IV prior to his accession, became queen consort by law but had no position at court and was forcibly barred from attending George IV's coronation and being crowned.

Only George I and Edward VIII were unmarried throughout their reigns.

Male consorts

While all British female consorts were automatically styled as queen, the titles of the three male consorts were inconsistent.

Prince George of Denmark, husband of Queen Anne, never received an official style as the consort, but was raised to the peerage of England as the Duke of Cumberland in 1689, several years before his wife's accession in 1702.
Prince Albert of Saxe-Coburg and Gotha, husband of Queen Victoria, did not take a British peerage title but was granted the title of Prince Consort as a distinct title in 1857, the only male consort in either the United Kingdom or its predecessor realms to have officially held the title. Victoria wished to style him as king consort, but the government would not allow it.
Prince Philip of Greece and Denmark, husband of Queen Elizabeth II, was raised to the peerage as Duke of Edinburgh in 1947, five years before his wife's accession, and was made a Prince of the United Kingdom in 1957.

Future consorts
Charles III ascended the throne following the death of his mother, Elizabeth II. His heir apparent is William, Prince of Wales, whose wife Catherine, Princess of Wales is presumed to become the next queen consort.

List of consorts

References

External links
www.royalty.nu

 
 
House of Saxe-Coburg and Gotha (United Kingdom)
Lists of queens
Consorts
British
Consorts